Edit Bérces (born May 16, 1964 in Zalaegerszeg, Hungary) is an ultramarathon runner, world record holder, former world and European champion.

Berces is Hungary's most successful ultra runner. During her career she set several world records, four of which still stand, and holds virtually all Hungarian records from 100 kilometers to 48 hours.

Top accomplishments include her 2000 world and European 100 kilometer titles and her 24-hour European championship victory in 2002. She has also twice won Hungary's top ultramarathon race, the five-day Vienna–Bratislava–Budapest Supermarathon. She won the IAU 24 Hour World Championship in 2001.

In 2002, just two weeks after winning the European 24-hour Championship, she set a world record over 24 hours on the track as well as a 100-mile world record en route. Based on those accomplishments, Ultramarathon World voted her the top female ultramarathoner of 2002.

In 2004, Berces set a 24-hour world record on the treadmill and set a 100-mile world record as well en route. Both of these records still stand. At the time, Bérces's 24-hour record was better than the men's world record.

World records

Personal bests

References

External links
Edit's personal site
Edit's run-2011 (site Deutsche Ultramarathon-Vereinigung (DUV))(German language) 
Treadmill World Records - Treadmill World Records

Living people
1964 births
People from Zalaegerszeg
Hungarian ultramarathon runners
Female ultramarathon runners
Hungarian female long-distance runners
Hungarian female marathon runners
Sportspeople from Zala County